Axial osteomalacia is a rare osteosclerotic disorder characterized by axial skeleton pain, coarsening of the trabecular bone pattern on radiographs of the axial but not appendicular skeleton.

References

External links 

Skeletal disorders